Štefan Planinc (8 September 1925–2017) was a Slovene surrealist painter also known for his illustrations for newspapers, magazines and books.

Planinc was born in Ljubljana in 1925. He studied at the Ljubljana Academy of Fine Arts and has received numerous awards for his works. He won the Levstik Award in 1959 and 1965.

Selected Illustrated Works

 Mame ni doma (Mum is not at Home), written by Erich Kästner, 1992
 Lessie se vrača (Lassie Come-Home), written by Eric Knight, 1985
 Pesmi za lačne sanjavce (Poems for Hungry Dreamers), written by Milan Dekleva, 1981
 Vrtiljak (The Merry-Go-Round), written by Tone Pavček, 1980
 Cigančica (The Little Gipsy Girl ), written by Tone Seliškar, 1979
 Hišica brez napisa (The Little House Without a Sign), written by Jože Snoj, 1978
 Kvadrat pa pika (A Square and a Dot), written by Gregor Strniša, 1977
 Andrejčkova glava je prazna (Little Andrej's Head is Empty), written by Žarko Petan, 1967
 Drejček in trije marsovčki (Drejček and the Three Martians), written by Vid Pečjak, 1965
 Tajno društvo PGC (The PGC Secret Society ), written by Anton Ingolič, 1959
 Živali v ukrivljenem zrcalu (Animals in a Curved Mirror), written by Vid Pečjak, 1957
 Črni bratje (Black Brothers), written by France Bevk, 1957
 Otroška leta (Childhood Years), written by France Bevk, 1956

References

Slovenian illustrators
Slovenian painters
Slovenian male painters

1925 births
Artists from Ljubljana
Levstik Award laureates
Jakopič Award laureates
University of Ljubljana alumni
2017 deaths